Tennosaar is an Estonian surname. Notable people with the surname include:

Kalmer Tennosaar (1928–2004), Estonian singer and journalist
Liina Tennosaar (born 1965), Estonian actress
Sirje Tennosaar (1943–2021), Estonian actress and television presenter 

Estonian-language surnames